Laura Eldridge is a women's health writer and activist. She began working with the legendary  women's health activist and author of The Doctor's Case Against The Pill, Barbara Seaman, when studying at Barnard College. She is co-author of  The No-Nonsense Guide To Menopause as well as the co-editor, also with Barbara Seaman, of Voices of the Women's Health Movement (Seven Stories Press, 2012) a collection of essays, interviews, and commentary by leading activists, writers, doctors, and sociologists on topics ranging across reproductive rights, sex and orgasm, activism, motherhood and birth control. She is also the author of In Our Control: The Complete Guide to Contraceptive Choices for Women.

Books
The No-Nonsense Guide To Menopause (Simon & Schuster, 2008)
 In Our Control: The Complete Guide to Contraceptive Choices for Women (Seven Stories Press, 2010)
 Voices of the Women's Health Movement, Volumes 1&2 (Seven Stories Press, 2012)

References

External links
 
 Eldridge & Co: Barbara Seaman and Laura Eldridge
 Contraceptive Choices for Women talk at Harvard Book Store
 KBOO FM Interview with Barbara Seaman and Laura Eldridge

Living people
Health and wellness writers
Sex education
American women's rights activists
American health activists
American women journalists
American non-fiction writers
Women's health movement
Year of birth missing (living people)
21st-century American women